The primeval history is the name given by biblical scholars to the first eleven chapters of the Book of Genesis, the story of the first years of the world's existence.

It tells how God creates the world and all its beings and places the first man and woman (Adam and Eve) in his Garden of Eden, how the first couple are expelled from God's presence, of the first murder which follows, and God's decision to destroy the world and save only the righteous Noah and his sons; a new humanity then descends from these sons and spreads throughout the world, but, although the new world is as sinful as the old, God has resolved never again to destroy the world by flood, and the history ends with Terah, the father of Abraham, from whom will descend God's chosen people.

Structure and content
The history contains some of the best-known stories in the Bible plus a number of genealogies, structured around the five-fold repetition of the toledot formula ("These are the generations of..."):
 The toledot of heaven and earth (Genesis 1:1–4:26)
 The Genesis creation narrative (the combined Hexameron or six-day cosmic creation-story of Genesis 1 and the human-focused creation-story of Genesis 2)
 The Eden narrative (the story of Adam and Eve and how they came to be expelled from God's presence)
 Cain and Abel and the first murder
 The book of the toledot of Adam (5:1–6:8) (The Hebrew includes the word "book")
 the first of two genealogies of Genesis, the Kenites, descendants of Cain, who invent various aspects of civilised life
 the second genealogy,  the descendants of Seth the third son of Adam, whose line leads to Noah and to Abraham
 the Sons of God who couple with the "daughters of men"; the Nephilim, "men of renown"; God's reasons for destroying the world (first account)
 The toledot of Noah (6–9:28)
 God's reasons for bringing  the Flood (second account), his warning to Noah, and the construction of the Ark
 the Genesis flood narrative in which the world is destroyed and re-created
 God's covenant with Noah, in which God promises never again to destroy the world by water
 Noah the husbandman (the invention of wine), his drunkenness, his three sons, and the Curse of Canaan
 The toledot of the sons of Noah (10:1–11:9)
 the Table of Nations (the sons of Noah and the origins of the nations of the world) and how they came to be scattered across the Earth through the Tower of Babel)
 The toledot of Shem (11:10–26)
 the descendants of Noah in the line of Shem to Terah, the father of Abraham

Composition history

Sources in Genesis

Scholars generally agree that the Torah, the collection of five books of which Genesis is the first, achieved something like its current form in the 5th century BCE. Genesis draws on a number of distinct "sources", including the Priestly source, the Yahwist and the Elohist – the last two are often referred to collectively as "non-Priestly", but the Elohist is not present in the primeval history and "non-Priestly" and "Yahwist" can be regarded here as interchangeable terms. The following table is based on Robert Kugler and Patrick Hartin, "An Introduction to the Bible", 2009:

Relationship of the primeval history to Genesis 12–50
Genesis 1–11 shows little relationship to the remainder of Genesis. For example, the names of its characters and its geography – Adam (man) and Eve (life), the Land of Nod ("Wandering"), and so on – are symbolic rather than real, and much of the narratives consist of lists of "firsts": the first murder, the first wine, the first empire-builder. Most notably, almost none of the persons, places and stories in it are ever mentioned anywhere else in the Bible. This has led some scholars to suppose that the history forms a late composition attached to Genesis and the Pentateuch to serve as an introduction. Just how late is a subject for debate: at one extreme are those who see it as a product of the Hellenistic period, in which case it cannot be earlier than the first decades of the 4th century BCE; on the other hand the  Yahwist source has been dated by some scholars, notably John Van Seters, to the exilic pre-Persian period (the 6th century BCE) precisely because the primeval history contains so much Babylonian influence in the form of myth.

Mesopotamian (and Egyptian) myths and the primeval history
Numerous Mesopotamian myths (and one Egyptian myth) are reflected in the primeval history. The myth of Atrahasis, for example, was the first to record a Great Flood, and may lie behind the story of Noah's flood. The following table sets out the myths behind the various Biblical tropes.

Themes and theology

Creation, destruction and re-creation
The history tells how God creates a world which is good (each act of the Genesis 1 ends with God marking it as good), and how evil contaminates it through disobedience (the Eden story) and violence (Cain and Abel).

Chronology
The Genesis creation narrative marks the start of the Biblical chronology, the elaborate system of markers, both hidden and overt, marking off a fictive 4000 year history of the world. From Creation to Abraham, time is calculated by adding the ages of the Patriarchs when their first child is born. It seems possible that the period of the Flood is not meant to be included in the count – for example, Shem, born 100 years before the Flood, "begot" his first son two years after it, which should make him 102, but Genesis 11:10–11 specifies that he is only 100, suggesting that time has been suspended. The period from the birth of Shem's third son Arpachshad (in the second year after the Flood) to Abraham's migration to Canaan is 365 years, mirroring Enoch's life-span of 365 years, the number of days in a year. There are 10 Patriarchs between Adam and the Flood and 10 between the Flood and Abraham – the Septuagint adds an extra ancestor so that the second group is 10 from the Flood to Terah. Noah and Terah each have three sons, of whom the first in each case is the most important.

See also
 Allegorical interpretations of Genesis
 Framework interpretation (Genesis)

Notes

References

Citations

Bibliography

 
 
 
 
 
 
  
 
 
 
 
 
 
 
 
 
 
 
 
 

Book of Genesis